ERO1-like protein beta is a protein that in humans is encoded by the ERO1LB gene.

Interactions 

ERO1LB has been shown to interact with P4HB.

References

Further reading